Psychotria greenwelliae, the Kauai wild coffee, is a species of plant in the family Rubiaceae. It is endemic to the islands of Kauai and Oahu in Hawaii. It is threatened by habitat loss.

References

greenwelliae
Endemic flora of Hawaii
Biota of Hawaii (island)
Biota of Oahu
Trees of Hawaii
Taxonomy articles created by Polbot